The Shells were an American doo wop ensemble formed in Brooklyn, New York, United States, in 1957.

The group scored a US pop hit in 1957 with the song "Baby Oh Baby", released on Johnson Records; the song cracked the Top 30. Further singles passed with little success until 1960, when producers Donn Fileti and Wayne Stierle re-issued "Baby Oh Baby". The tune hit number 21 on the US Billboard Hot 100 upon re-release. The group issued several further singles, as well as a split LP with The Dubs in 1963.

Members
Nate Bouknight
Randy Shade Alston
Bobby Nurse
Danny Small
Gus Geter
Alphonse Merkman

Singles
Note:This list is incomplete
"Angel Eyes"   (1957) and (What's In An Angel's Eyes 1960)
"Baby Oh Baby" (1957; re-released 1961)
"Sippin' Soda" (1958)
"She Wasn't Meant for Me" (1959)
"Be Sure My Love" (1960)
"So Fine" (1960)
"Explain it to Me" (1961)
"Happy Holiday (1962; with Ray Lamont Jones)
"Deep in my Heart" (1962)
"Will you Miss me When I'm Gone?" (date unknown)
 My Cherie (1957)

References

External links
 The Shells Discography
 The Shells Biography I
 The Shells Biography II

Doo-wop groups
Musical groups established in 1957
Musical groups from Brooklyn
1957 establishments in New York City